The 2010 Porsche Carrera Cup Deutschland season was the 25th German Porsche Carrera Cup season. It began on 25 April at Hockenheim and finished on 17 October at the same circuit, after nine races. It ran as a support championship for the 2010 DTM season. Frenchman Nicolas Armindo won the championship despite runner-up Nick Tandy winning more races. He also became the first non-German to win the championship.

Teams and drivers

Race calendar and results

Championship standings

Drivers' championship

† — Drivers did not finish the race, but were classified as they completed over 90% of the race distance.

External links
The Porsche Carrera Cup Germany website
Porsche Carrera Cup Germany Online Magazine

Porsche Carrera Cup Germany seasons
Porsche Carrera Cup Germany